The 2021 Liège–Bastogne–Liège was a Belgian road cycling one-day race that took place on 25 April 2021. It was the 107th edition of Liège–Bastogne–Liège and the 16th event of the 2021 UCI World Tour, and was won by Tadej Pogačar.

Teams
Twenty-five teams were invited to the race, including all nineteen UCI WorldTeams and six UCI ProTeams.

UCI WorldTeams

 
 
 
 
 
 
 
 
 
 
 
 
 
 
 
 
 
 
 

UCI ProTeams

Result

References

Liège–Bastogne–Liège
Liège–Bastogne–Liège
Liège–Bastogne–Liège
Liège–Bastogne–Liège